First Ya Gotta Shake the Gate is the fourteenth studio album by American funk rock band Funkadelic. The album was released by The C Kunspyruhzy in 2014 and consists of newly recorded material.

The album consists of 3 discs comprising 33 tracks in total, which has been explained to mirror the 33 years that had elapsed since Funkadelic's last official album release in 1981, The Electric Spanking of War Babies. Like most of the Funkadelic catalog, the album features cover artwork by artist Pedro Bell.

Release
First Ya Gotta Shake The Gate was released in digital format on November 25, 2014. The official CD release, after first being announced for December 1, was delayed to December 23, 2014.

The album's first single released was "The Naz", a song featuring Sly Stone, in 2013. A second single, "Ain't That Funkin' Kinda Hard On You?", was digitally released on October 21, 2014, in connection with the release of George Clinton's autobiography, Brothers Be, Yo Like George, Ain't That Funkin' Kinda Hard On You?.

"As In" is a remake of Bootsy's Rubber Band's "As In (I Love You)" and features the late Jessica Cleaves on vocals. This album also features the first appearances of George's grandson Trazae rapping on a few tunes, and George's granddaughters Kandy Apple Redd, and George's stepdaughter Nakid 87, Sidney Barnes, Sly Stone, and posthumous appearances by Garry Shider and Belita Woods are featured on the album.  Garry's son Garrett Shider replaces his father. This was the last Funkadelic project Bernie Worrell contributed to before his death.

Track listing

Personnel

Vocals-George Clinton, Sly Stone, Belita Woods, Garry Shider, Garrett Shider, Kendra Foster, Steve Boyd, Robert 'P-Nut' Johnson, El DeBarge, Tracey Lewis, Kandy Apple Redd (Tonysha Nelson and Patavian Lewis), Kim Manning, Sidney Barnes, Lashonda 'Sativa Diva' Clinton, Jessica Cleaves, Kim Burrell, Rob Manzoli, Del the Funky Homosapien
Keyboards- Danny Bedrosian, Rob Mandell, David Spradley, Bernie Worrell (piano on Yesterdejavu), Sly Stone, 
Guitars- Michael Hampton, Garry Shider, DeWayne "Blackbyrd" McKnight, Garrett Shider, Rob Manzoli, Trafael Lewis, Brad Jordan, Corey "Funkafangez" Stoot 
Bass- Rodney 'Skeet' Curtis, Lige Curry, Jeff "Cherokee" Bunn, Cordell MossonAnthony Nicholson on Jolene, Jimmy Ali, Hunter Daws, Michael B. Patterson (bass on Yesterdejavu)
Drums- Nestor Mumm-Altuve, DJ Toure, Donald "Duck" Bailey, Lawrence Hilson Savar Martin on Jolene (drums on Yesterdejavu)
Horns  Andrae Grant-Tenor Sax, Marion Ross III-Trumpet, Randall Cook-Trombone 
Percussion- Larry Fratangelo
Violin- Lili Haydn
Didgeridoo- William Thoren
Co-producers- Rob 'G-Koop' Mandell, Soul Clap (Eli Goldstein and Charles Levine), Rob Manzoli, Sue Brooks , Quazedelic
Album Art- Pedro Bell

References

External links
 First Ya Gotta Shake the Gate at iTunes

2014 albums
Funkadelic albums